Alege is a Bendi language of Nigeria.

Further reading
 Obikudo, Ebitare F. and Bosco C. Okolo-Obi. "The Vowel System of Àlégē." Arusha Working Papers in African Linguistics, 4(1): 3-20.

References

Bendi languages
Languages of Nigeria